The canton of Oyonnax-Sud is a former canton (administrative division) in eastern France. It was disbanded following the French canton reorganisation that came into effect in March 2015. It had 19,038 inhabitants (2012).

The canton comprised 5 communes:
Bellignat
Géovreisset
Groissiat
Martignat
Oyonnax (partly)

Demographics

See also
Cantons of the Ain department

Notes

Former cantons of Ain
2015 disestablishments in France
States and territories disestablished in 2015